Khaprumama Parvatkar (1879–1953) was a musician from Goa, India who played tabla, as well as ghumot and the sarangi.
Well versed in Dhrupad, Khayal and folk goan music forms, he was particularly known for his gifted and phenomenal taal and laya control, with the honorary title of Layabhaskar (laya= rhythm, bhaskar = Sun).

Though not very well known amongst the masses, classical musicians of his time critically acclaimed his authority over rhythm and Indian classical percussion instruments. 
Mogubai Kurdikar, the mother of Kishori Amonkar, received initial guidance and support from him.

References

External links
Khaprumama's page in the Vijaya Parrikar Library of Indian Classical Music

1879 births
1953 deaths
Musicians from Goa
20th-century Indian musicians
People from Portuguese India